For most economies in the world, their leading export and import trading partner in terms of value is either the European Union or China, and to a certain  degree, the United States and Russia. Other countries like Brazil, India, South Africa, South Korea and Turkey are emerging as significant markets or source countries in different parts of the world.

Individually for each European Union member trade with all other European Union members collectively is greater than any other trading partner.  Both the European Union and the United States have China as their largest origin of imports. China's own largest source of imports is European Union. In other parts of the world the European Union or the United States is the largest trading partner, however other leading trading countries may be the most prominent in certain countries. Brazil, Russia and South Africa are becoming increasingly dominant in their respective regional areas.

Some isolated countries depend on a larger neighbour to be their largest trading partner – Venezuela is one of Cuba's key export markets, while doubly-landlocked Uzbekistan exports chiefly to Tajikistan and Afghanistan, its singly-landlocked neighbours.

The largest import and export merchandise trade partners for most countries of the world are listed below. Details for the European Union, Hong Kong and Macau are also included. In most cases the data relates to 2021 rankings. Data was extracted from the World Trade Organization's Trade Profile Database.

List of 30 largest bilateral trade volume in 2013 
The following table shows figures for 30 largest bilateral trade volume in 2013 according to the World Trade Organization.

References 

Trade partners
Trade partners
Geopolitics
Trade
Lists of trading partners